Chad Cromwell (born June 14, 1957) is an American rock drummer whose music career has spanned more than 30 years. He is the founding member of a band called Fortunate Sons, which released a self-titled album in 2004. 

Cromwell has worked with multiple prominent artists from various genres, including Neil Young, Mark Knopfler, Joe Walsh, Joss Stone, Bonnie Raitt, and Crosby, Stills, and Nash.

Early life
Cromwell was born on June 14, 1957, in Paducah, Kentucky. When he was three years old he moved with his parents and siblings to Memphis, Tennessee in 1960. In 1970, he moved to Nashville, Tennessee, and remained there for the rest of his childhood.

He started playing drums at the age of eight, wearing headphones as he played along to records in an upstairs room of his parents' home. By the age of twelve he was playing in garage bands in the local neighborhood.

Career
Cromwell started recording and touring with Joe Walsh in 1986, appearing on two albums, Got Any Gum? and Ordinary Average Guy.

In 1987, Cromwell began a collaboration with songwriter Neil Young. The initial sessions became Neil Young & The Bluenotes. Since then he has recorded and toured with Young on several occasions, and appears on albums such as Freedom (1989), Prairie Wind (2005) Living with War (2006) and Chrome Dreams II (2007). He has also appeared in Heart of Gold, a documentary capturing the debut of Neil Young's album, Prairie Wind (along with other Young classics). This was filmed at the Ryman auditorium and directed by Jonathan Demme.
 
Cromwell is also known for his contributions to Mark Knopfler's solo albums Golden Heart (1996), Sailing to Philadelphia (2000), The Ragpicker's Dream (2002) and Shangri-La (2004). He was also part of Knopfler's band during the tours of his first solo albums.

Cromwell toured with Crosby, Stills, Nash & Young in the summer of 2006.

He has also worked with many other artists including Dave Stewart, Vince Gill, Amy Grant, Lady Antebellum, Diana Krall, Willie Nelson, Jackson Browne, Boz Scaggs, Wynonna, Trisha Yearwood, Miranda Lambert, Bonnie Raitt, Peter Frampton, Allison Moorer, Chris Knight, Joss Stone, Rodney Crowell, Marty Stuart, and Stevie Nicks.

In the mid 2000s, Cromwell formed the band Fortunate Sons along with Michael Rhodes, Gary Nicholson, Kenny Greenberg, and Reese Wynans. They released a self-titled album in 2004. He is also a member of the occasional touring band, Big Al Anderson and The Balls, led by former NRBQ guitarist Al Anderson.

In 2012, he appeared on The Beach Boys' studio album entitled That's Why God Made the Radio. In 2013, he was featured on Bonnie Tyler's album, Rocks and Honey.

In 2014, he provided drums on Drake Bell's third studio album, Ready Steady Go!

Personal life
He lives in both Nashville and Los Angeles with his wife, Windy.

Collaborations 

With Amy Grant
 House of Love (A&M Records, 1994)
 Behind the Eyes (A&M Records, 1997)
 Legacy... Hymns and Faith (A&M Records, 2002)
 Simple Things (A&M Records, 2003)
 Rock of Ages... Hymns and Faith (World Records, 2005)
 Somewhere Down the Road (Sparrow Records, 2010)

With Mark Knopfler
 Golden Heart (Vertigo Records, 1996)
 Sailing to Philadelphia (Mercury Records, 2000)
 The Ragpicker's Dream (Mercury Records, 2002)
 Shangri-La (Mercury Records, 2004)
 One Take Radio Sessions (Mercury Records, 2005)

With Jim Lauderdale
 Whisper (BNA Records, 1997)
 Patchwork River (Thirty Tigers, 2010)
 I'm a Song (Sky Crunch Records, 2014)

With Stevie Nicks
 In Your Dreams (Reprise Records, 2011)
 24 Karat Gold: Songs from the Vault (Reprise Records, 2014)

With Charles Kelley
 The Driver (Capitol Records, 2015)

With Alison Krauss
 Windy City (Capitol Records, 2017)

With Mary Chapin Carpenter
 Between Here and Gone (Columbia Records, 2004)

With Ashton Shepherd
 Sounds So Good (MCA Records, 2008)

With Lee Roy Parnell
 Midnight Believer (Vector Records, 2017)

With Steven Curtis Chapman
 Signs of Life (Sparrow Records, 1996)

With Craig Morgan
 This Ole Boy (Black River, 2012)

With Bob Seger
 Ride Out (Capitol Records, 2014)
 I Knew You When (Capitol Records, 2017)

With Ronnie Dunn
 Ronnie Dunn (Arista Records, 2011)
 Re-Dunn (Little Will-E Records, 2020)

With Kenny Marks
 Attitude (DaySpring Records, 1986)
 Make It Right (DaySpring Records, 1987)

With Trisha Yearwood
 Jasper County (MCA Records, 2005)
 Heaven, Heartache and the Power of Love (Big Machine Records, 2007)
 PrizeFighter: Hit After Hit (RCA Records, 2014)

With Anders Osborne
 Buddha & The Blues (Back on Dumaine Records, 2019)

With Kim Richey
 Kim Richey (Mercury Records, 1995)

With Kix Brooks
 New to This Town (Arista Records, 2012)

With Neil Young
 This Note's For You (Reprise Records, 1988)
 Freedom (Reprise Records, 1989)
 Prairie Wind (Reprise Records, 2005)
 Living with War (Reprise Records, 2006)
 Chrome Dreams II (Reprise Records, 2007)
 Fork in the Road (Reprise Records, 2009)

With Drake Bell
 Ready Steady Go! (Warner Bros. Records, 2014)

With Allison Moorer
 Alabama Song (MCA Records, 1998)
 The Hardest Part (MCA Records, 2000)
 Down to Believing (Proper Records, 2015)

With Sweet Pea Atkinson
 Get What You Deserve (Blue Note, 2017)

With Crosby, Stills, Nash & Young
 American Dream (Atlantic Records, 1988)

With Keb' Mo'
 Keep It Simple (Sony, 2004)

With Blake Shelton
 Blake Shelton (Warner Bros. Records, 2001)
 Pure BS (Warner Bros. Records, 2007)

With Radney Foster
 See What You Want to See (Arista Records, 1999)

With Willie Nelson
 To All the Girls... (Legacy Recordings, 2013)
 First Rose of Spring (Legacy Recordings, 2020)
 A Beautiful Time (Legacy Recordings, 2022)

With Joe Walsh
 Got Any Gum? (Warner Bros. Records, 1987)
 Ordinary Average Guy (Epic Records, 1991)

With Josh Turner
 Everything Is Fine (MCA Records, 2007)
 Deep South (MCA Records, 2017)
 Country State of Mind (MCA Records, 2020)

With Orianthi Panagaris
 Heaven in This Hell (Robo Records, 2013)

With Katie Armiger
 Believe (Cold River Records, 2008)
 Fall Into Me (Cold River Records, 2013)

With Lionel Richie
 Tuskegee (Mercury Records, 2012)

With Emmylou Harris and Mark Knopfler
 All the Roadrunning (Mercury Records, 2006)

With Gretchen Wilson
 All Jacked Up (Epic Records, 2005)

With Roch Voisine
 Coup de tête (Les Disques Star Records, 1994)
 Americana (RCA Records, 2008)

With Jake Owen
 Barefoot Blue Jean Night (RCA Records, 2011)

With Dolly Parton
 Blue Smoke (Dolly Records, 2014)

With The Beach Boys
 That's Why God Made the Radio (Capitol Records, 2012)

With Livingston Taylor
 There You Are Again (Coconut Bay, 2005)
 Last Alaska Moon (Coconut Bay, 2010)

With Pat McLaughlin
 Next Five Miles (Creamstyle, 2003)
 Horsefly (Creamstyle, 2006)

With Trace Adkins
 Love Will... (Show Dog, 2013)

With William Lee Golden
 American Vagabond (MCA Records, 1986)

With Lee Brice
 I Don't Dance (Curb Records, 2014)

With Lee Ann Womack
 Some Things I Know (MCA Records, 1998)
 I Hope You Dance (MCA Records, 2000)

With Frankie Miller
 Long Way Home (Brighton Music, 2006)

With Lady Antebellum
 Lady Antebellum (Capitol Records, 2008)
 Need You Now (Capitol Records, 2010)
 Own the Night (Capitol Records, 2011)
 Golden (Capitol Records, 2017)

With Toby Keith
 A Classic Christmas (Show Dog Nashville, 2007)
 Big Dog Daddy (Show Dog Nashville, 2007)
 Bullets in the Gun (Universal Music, 2010)
 Clancy's Tavern (Universal Music, 2011)
 Hope on the Rocks (Universal Music, 2012)
 Drinks After Work (Universal Music, 2013)
 35 MPH Town (Universal Music, 2015)
 Peso in My Pocket (Universal Music, 2021)

With Beth Nielsen Chapman
 Uncovered (BNC Records, 2014)

With Rebecca Lynn Howard
 Rebecca Lynn Howard (MCA Records, 2000)

With Shawn Camp
 Fireball (Skeeterbit, 2006)

With Kellie Pickler
 100 Proof (BNA Records, 2012)

With Holly Williams
 Here with Me (Mercury Records, 2009)

With Joe Nichols
 III (Universal Music, 2005)

With Mark Collie
 Book of My Blues (Harvest, 2021)

With LeAnn Rimes
 Blue (Curb Records, 1996)
 Spitfire (Curb Records, 2013)

With Matraca Berg
 Sunday Morning to Sunday Night (Rising Tride Records, 1997)

With Chely Wright
 Never Love You Enough (MCA Records, 2001)

With John Michael Montgomery
 Brand New Me (Atlantic Records, 2000)

With Pieta Brown
 Remember the Sun (One Little Independent Records, 2007)
 Mercury (Red House Records, 2011)
 Postcards (Lustre Records, 2017)

With Kenny Chesney
 When the Sun Goes Down (BNA Records, 2004)
 Be as You Are (BNA Records, 2005)
 The Road and the Radio (BNA Records, 2005)
 The Big Revival (Columbia Records, 2014)
 Cosmic Hallelujah (Columbia Records, 2016)
 Songs for the Saints (Warner Bros. Records, 2018)
 Here and Now (Blue Chair, 2020)

With Rodney Crowell
 The Houston Kid (Sugar Hill Records, 2001)
 The Outsider (Columbia Records, 2005)

With Danielle Bradbery
 Danielle Bradbery (Big Machine Records, 2013)

With Sonya Isaacs
 Sonya Isaacs (Lyric Street Records, 2000)

With Bonnie Tyler
 Rocks and Honey (Warner Bros. Records, 2013)

With Jessica Simpson
 In This Skin (Columbia Records, 2003)

With Billy Burnette
 Rock & Roll With It (Rock & Roll With It Records, 2011)

With Brian Wilson
 No Pier Pressure (Capitol Records, 2015)

With Jo Dee Messina
 Unmistakable: Love (Curb Records, 2010)

With John Oates
 1000 Miles Of Life (Phunk Shui Records, 2008)
 Good Road to Follow (Elektra Records, 2014)

With George Ducas
 George Ducas (Liberty Records, 1994)

With Joss Stone
 LP1 (Surfdog Records, 2011)
 Never Forget My Love (Bay Street, 2022)

With Michael Bolton
 All That Matters (Columbia Records, 1997)

With Paul Carrack
 I Know That Name (Carrack UK, 2008)

With Cyndi Lauper
 Detour (Rhino Records, 2016)

With Miranda Lambert
 Kerosene (Epic Records, 2005)
 Crazy Ex-Girlfriend (Columbia Records, 2007)
 Revolution (Columbia Records, 2009)

With Jewel
 Picking Up the Pieces (Sugar Hill Records, 2015)

With Chris Norman
 Chris Norman (Polydor Records, 1994)

With Terri Clark
 Classic (EMI, 2012)

With Peter Frampton
 Now (33rd Street Records, 2003)
 Fingerprints (Polydor Records, 2006)
 Thank You Mr. Churchill (New Door Records, 2010)
 Hummingbird in a Box (Red Distribution, 2014)

With Vince Gill
 Next Big Thing (MCA Records, 2003)
 These Days (MCA Records, 2006)
 Guitar Slinger (MCA Records, 2011)

With Joan Baez
 Play Me Backwards (Virgin Records, 1992)
 Gone from Danger (Guardian, 1997)

With Emmylou Harris and Rodney Crowell
 Old Yellow Moon (Nonesuch Records, 2013)

With Joe Bonamassa
 Dust Bowl (J&R Adventures, 2011)

References

External links
 Chad Cromwell, Autobiographical Notes
 Chad Cromwell, Legends Rock TV Show
 Chad Cromwell, Discography on Discogs.com

1957 births
American rock drummers
American country drummers
American session musicians
Living people
Musicians from Paducah, Kentucky
Rock musicians from Kentucky
Country musicians from Kentucky
20th-century American drummers
American male drummers
20th-century American male musicians